A Turkmen rug (or Turkmen carpet or Turkoman carpet) is a type of handmade floor-covering textile traditionally originating in Central Asia. It is useful to distinguish between the original Turkmen tribal rugs and the rugs produced in large numbers for export mainly in Pakistan and Iran today. The original Turkmen rugs were produced by the Turkmen tribes who are the main ethnic group in Turkmenistan and are also found in Afghanistan and Iran. They are used for various purposes, including tent rugs, door hangings and bags of various sizes.

Traditional turkmen carpet making art has been inscribed on the Representative list of the Intangible Cultural Heritage of Humanity by the Intergovernmental Committee for the Safeguarding of Intangible Cultural Heritage of UNESCO in 2019.

History 

A few centuries back, almost all Turkmen rugs were produced by nomadic tribes almost entirely with locally obtained materials, wool from the herds and vegetable dyes, or other natural dyes from the land. They used geometrical designs that varied from tribe to tribe; most famous are the Yomut, Ersari, Saryk, Salor, and Tekke. Irregularities, considered part of the charm by many rug collectors  were fairly common since natural materials varied from batch to batch and woolen warp or weft may stretch, especially on a loom that is regularly folded up for transport and set up anew at another camp.
More recently, large rug workshops in the cities have appeared, there are fewer irregularities, and the technology has changed some. Since about 1910, synthetic dyes have been used along with natural ones. The size of nomadic rugs is limited to what can be done on a nomad's portable loom; larger rugs have always been produced in the villages, but they are now more common. Using cotton for warp and weft threads has also become common.

The rugs produced in large numbers for export in Pakistan and Iran and sold under the name of Turkmen rugs are mostly made using synthetic dyes, with cotton warps and wefts and wool pile. They have little in common with the original Turkmen tribal rugs. In these export rugs, various patterns and colours are used, but the most typical is that of the Bukhara design, which derives from the Tekke main carpet, often with a red or tan background (picture). Another is derived from the Ersari main carpet, with the octagonal elephant's foot design. The Turkmen Carpet Museum, which preserves examples of the original Turkmen tribal rugs, is located in Ashgabat.

Many Afghan rugs with the traditional Turkmen design are made by ethnic Turkmens living in this country. Afghanistan produces a lot of rugs, mainly for export, and many of those are in a "Bokhara" design. However, there are also some  Afghan rugs using Turkmen designs.

Turkmenistan 

At the end of the 20th century, carpet weaving in Turkmenistan had become one of the most important sectors of the economy. In 1992, Turkmen Carpet Day officially became a public national holiday, celebrated annually on the last Sunday in May. Among the modern Turkmen carpets stands the world's largest handmade carpet total area of 301 m2, which was woven in 2001, and in 2003 entered into the Guinness Book of Records.

Heraldry 
The vertical strip of the Flag of Turkmenistan shows the five main patterns of Turkmen carpets. These patterns are displayed with secondary figures distributed along the edges. The patterns reflect the national unity of Turkmenistan. The five traditional carpet motifs in the red disc of the Emblem of Turkmenistan represent the five major tribes or houses, and stand for the traditional and religious values of the country. These Turkmen tribes in traditional order are Teke, Yomut, Arsary, Chowdur and Saryk (Saryq).

Ministry of Carpets 

State Association Turkmenhaly is a major supplier to the world market of pure wool pile hand-made Turkmen carpets from Turkmenistan. The principal activities of the corporation are the production and sale of Turkmen carpets and rugs, preserving the traditions of carpet weaving hand, the restoration of old carpet ornaments and articles.

Turkmen Carpet Museum 
The Turkmenistan Presidential Decree of 20 March 1993 in Ashgabat created the Turkmen Carpet Museum. The Carpet Museum is one of the cultural centers of Turkmenistan, which has about 2,000 carpet exhibits, including rare ones, on display. For example, the museum has the smallest carpet product, designed to be worn with keys. The museum conducts restoration of antique carpets as well. It's a challenging process; some artfully woven old specimens contain up to 1,350,000 knots. The museum is constantly updated, and its employees conduct searches and compiles collections of old carpets. The new building of the National Museum of Turkmen Carpets has an overall space of 5089 m2. The museum also hosts international scientific forums and conferences.

Major towns producing rugs 
Bereket has a Turkmen carpet weaving factory which has been in operation since 1923.

See also
Yomut carpet
Suzani (textile)
Tush kyiz

References

External links 

 Carpet Museum of Turkmenistan
 Tekke Bokhara: History and evolution of Bokhara rugs
 History of Turkmen Carpets
 Background on origin of Turkmen Rugs
 Bokharas - Design of Bokhara rugs

Rugs and carpets
Afghan rugs and carpets
Persian rugs and carpets
Turkic rugs and carpets
Pakistani rugs and carpets
Turkmenistan culture
Ethnic Turkmen culture